Javier Illana García (born 12 September 1985 in Leganés, Madrid) is a Spanish diver. He competed in the 3 m springboard event at three Summer Olympics: Athens 2004, Beijing 2008 and London 2012, where he reached the final. Illana won the bronze medal in the 1m springboard event at the 2010 European Aquatics Championships. Besides his sport career, he also works as a coach at the Spanish diving TV Show "¡Mira Quien Salta!".

References 

1985 births
Living people
Divers at the 2004 Summer Olympics
Divers at the 2008 Summer Olympics
Divers at the 2012 Summer Olympics
Olympic divers of Spain
Spanish male divers
People from Leganés
Sportspeople from the Community of Madrid